Miloš Gligorijević (born December 21, 1976) is a Serbian professional basketball coach. He last served as coordinator of Youth National Teams in Georgian Basketball Federation, Head coach of Georgia U20 National Team and Assistant coach in Georgia men's National Team

Coaching career
In 2001, at age of 24, Gligorijević started working in KK Partizan Youth program.

2008, as a head coach of University of Belgrade, won second place at 8th European Universities Basketball Championship in Novi Sad.

In 2009, he was added to coaching staff of KK Partizan first team as assistant coach and contributed to all trophies won in next four seasons.

In October 2013, Gligorijević was named a head coach of Gimle Basket Bergen in Norwegian Premier Leagues (BLNO) with men's and women's team. With both teams, he won regular season competitions, with men was a winner of Final tournament, while with women won silver medal.

On national level, in 2010 he was member of coaching staff in Serbia U18 National Team at U18 European Championship and in 2013 assistant in Serbia men's National Team at Eurobasket. From 2015, he was employed in Georgian Basketball Federation on various positions in Youth Program and Men's National Team.

References

External links
 Profile on eurobasket.com

1976 births
Living people
Sportspeople from Belgrade
Serbian men's basketball coaches
Serbian expatriate basketball people in Georgia (country)
Serbian expatriate basketball people in Norway